
This is a list of aircraft in alphabetical order beginning with 'T'.

References

Further reading

External links 

 List of aircraft (T)